The Fundy Footpath is a  hiking trail that starts at the Fundy Trail Parkway from Big Salmon River to Fundy National Park in New Brunswick, Canada. The trail connects to the  Fundy Trail at Fundy National Park, which in turn connects to the Dobson Trail.  The trail's earliest route was blazed by Jack McKay in the early 1980s but it fell into disuse. It was reestablished by Alonzo and Gilles Leger along with many, many other volunteers throughout the late 1980 and early 1990s. The trail was officially opened in 1994 under the management of the Fundy Hiking Trail Association Inc. In 2012 more than 500 people hiked the trail, which offers a challenging hiking experience lasting 4 days.

References

External links
Fundy Hiking Trail Association

Hiking trails in New Brunswick
Transport in Albert County, New Brunswick